The Honduran Chess Championship is organized by FENAH, the chess federation of Honduras, which was founded in 1993.

Winners since 1983

{| class="sortable wikitable"
! Year !! Champion
|-
| 1983 || David Singh
|-
| 1984 || Ignacio García
|-
| 1986 || Daniel Colindres
|-
| 1987 || José Cruz
|-
| 1988 ||Ricardo Haces
|-
| 1989 || José Cruz
|-
| 1990 || Ignacio García
|-
| 1991 ||Javier Medina
|-
| 1992 ||Javier Medina
|- 
| 1993 ||Samuel Norales
|- 
| 1994 ||Jeremías Samayoa
|- 
| 1995 ||Jeremías Samayoa
|-
| 1997 ||José Antonio Guillén
|- 
| 1998 ||José Antonio Guillén
|- 
| 1999 ||José Antonio Guillén
|-
| 2000 ||José Antonio Guillén
|-
| 2001 || 
|-
| 2002 ||Luis Sieiro
|-
| 2003 || Ricardo Urbina
|-
| 2004 ||José Antonio Guillén
|-
| 2005 ||José Antonio Guillén
|-
| 2006 ||José Antonio Guillén
|-
| 2008 ||Iván Meza
|-
| 2009 ||Javier Medina
|-
| 2010–11 || Daniel Colindres
|-
| 2011–12 || Daniel Colindres
|-
| 2013 ||Nahún Gavarrete
|-
| 2014 ||Nahún Gavarrete
|-
| 2015 ||Alejandro Chinchilla
|-
| 2016 ||José Antonio Guillén
|-
| 2017 ||Ricardo Urbina
|-
| 2018 ||Nahún Gavarrete
|-
| 2019 ||José Antonio Guillén
|}

References

Chess national championships
Chess in Honduras
Sports competitions in Honduras